Darrin James Murray (born 4 September 1967) is a former New Zealand international cricketer. He played eight Test matches and one One Day International for New Zealand, all in the 1994/95 season.

Murray was born at Christchurch and played domestically for the Canterbury cricket team. After retirement he became an accountant.

References

1967 births
Living people
New Zealand cricketers
New Zealand Test cricketers
New Zealand One Day International cricketers
Canterbury cricketers
Cricketers from Christchurch
South Island cricketers